Barbara Stella Hesse-Bukowska (8 February 1930 – 9 December 2013) was a Polish pianist.  Her family had a long-standing musical history, as her father was a violinist and conductor, her mother was a pianist and teacher, and her grandfather was a piano tuner.  Her mother was her first teacher.  Her subsequent teachers included Czesław Aniołkiewicz and, at the Warsaw Conservatory, Maria Glińska-Wąsowska.

Education and achievements
Hesse-Bukowska was born in Łódź. She graduated from Warsaw's State Higher School of Music in June 1949. In the same year, she took part in the first postwar edition of the IV International Chopin Piano Competition, and won 2nd prize.  Five years later, she went to Paris, where she continued studies with Arthur Rubinstein.  She subsequently undertook an intercontinental concert career, which she combined with teaching at Wroclaw's Higher School of Music.  In 1972, Hesse-Bukowska became a professor at the Fryderyk Chopin Music Academy.

Her honours and awards included the Złoty Krzyż Zasługi (Cross of Merit; 1955) and the Order Sztandaru Pracy (Order of the Banner of Work) 2nd class (1959) and 1st class (1984).  Outside of Poland, in 1962, she was awarded the Harriet Cohen Foundation's Piano Medal.

References

External links
  Biography of Barbara Hesse-Bukowska at The Fryderyk Chopin Institute in Warsaw.
  Biography of Barbara Hesse-Bukowska at the Culture.pl 

1930 births
2013 deaths
Polish classical pianists
Polish women pianists
Polish music educators
Piano pedagogues
Recipients of the Order of the Banner of Work
Long-Thibaud-Crespin Competition prize-winners
Prize-winners of the International Chopin Piano Competition
Musicians from Łódź
20th-century classical pianists
Women classical pianists
20th-century Polish women
20th-century women pianists